In algebraic topology, the Hopf construction constructs a map from the join X*Y of two spaces X and Y to the suspension SZ of a space Z out of a map from X×Y to Z. It was introduced by  in the case when X and Y are spheres.  used it to define the J-homomorphism.

Construction

The Hopf construction can be obtained as the composition of a map
X*Y → S(X×Y)
and the suspension
S(X×Y) → S(Z) 
of the map from X×Y to Z.

The map from X*Y to S(X×Y) can be obtained by regarding both sides as a quotient of X×Y×I where I is the unit interval. For X*Y one identifies (x,y,0) with (z,y,0) and (x,y,1) with (x,z,1), while for S(X×Y) one contracts all points of the form (x,y,0) to a point and also contracts all points of the form (x,y,1) to a point. So the map from X×Y×I to S(X×Y) factors through X*Y.

References

Algebraic topology